Llangwm may refer to one of several places in Wales:

Llangwm, Conwy
Llangwm, Monmouthshire
Llangwm, Pembrokeshire